Third Street is a Metromover station in Downtown, Miami, Florida, adjacent to the Downtown Distributor freeway. This station is located at 3rd South West  Street and 250th South Miami Avenue, opening to service May 26, 1994.

Station layout

Places of interest
Riverfront East Complex
300 Miami Avenue Building
340 Miami Avenue Building
280 Miami Avenue Building
260 Miami Avenue Building
Lynx Tower Complex
Riverfront West (The Ivy at Riverfront, Mint at Riverfront Tower, and Riverfront West Retail Center)
Wind Tower at Riverfront

External links
 
 MDT – Metromover Stations
 Miami Avenue entrance from Google Maps Street View
 Third Street Metromover Station (Miami, 1994) | Structurae

Metromover stations
Railway stations in the United States opened in 1994
1994 establishments in Florida
Brickell Loop
Omni Loop